The silky tuco-tuco (Ctenomys sericeus) is a species of rodent in the family Ctenomyidae. It is endemic to Argentina.

References

Tuco-tucos
Mammals of Argentina
Mammals of Patagonia
Endemic fauna of Argentina
Mammals described in 1903
Taxonomy articles created by Polbot